Richard Fraser may refer to:

Richard Fraser of Touchfraser (13–14th century), Scottish noble
Richard Fraser (lyricist), roadie and lyricist for Emerson, Lake and Palmer
Richard Duncan Fraser (c. 1784–1857), Canadian fur trader and businessman
Richard Fraser (actor) (1913–1971), English actor
Richard S. Fraser (1913–1988), American Trotskyist and revolutionary integrationist
Richard Fraser (curler), Canadian wheelchair curler
Rick Fraser (politician) (born 1972), Canadian politician

See also
Ricky Frazier (born 1958), American basketball player